Janne Müller-Wieland (born 28 October 1986) is a German field hockey player who competed in the 2008 and 2012 Summer Olympics.

References

External links
 

1986 births
Living people
German female field hockey players
Olympic field hockey players of Germany
Field hockey players at the 2008 Summer Olympics
Field hockey players at the 2012 Summer Olympics
Field hockey players at the 2016 Summer Olympics
Olympic bronze medalists for Germany
Olympic medalists in field hockey
Medalists at the 2016 Summer Olympics
Field hockey players from Hamburg
Female field hockey defenders
21st-century German women